Odostomia nuciformis is a species of sea snail, a marine gastropod mollusc in the family Pyramidellidae, the pyrams and their allies.

Description
The large, shortly ovate shell is yellowish to milk-white. Its length measures 7.7 mm. The whorls of the protoconch are deeply immersed; only half of the last turn is seen in tilted position when viewed from above. The five whorls of the teleoconch are increasing rapidly' in size. They are well rounded, having their summits closely appressed to the preceding whorl. The suture is moderately well impressed. The periphery and the base of the body whorl are well rounded. The ovate aperture is rather large, and white within. The posterior angle is acute. The outer lip is moderately thin at the edge but thicker within. The columella is short, strongly curved and with a strong oblique fold at its insertion. It is reinforced by the attenuated base. The parietal wall is covered by a thin callus.

Distribution
This species occurs in the Pacific Ocean off Washington, USA

References

External links
 To World Register of Marine Species
 To ITIS

nuciformis
Gastropods described in 1864